The NZFC 2008–09 season is the fifth season of the New Zealand Football Championship competition.

The previous seasons champion, Waitakere United, and second-ranked club Auckland City FC will also be competing in the 2008-09 O-League which will run alongside the NZFC season.

Changes for 2008/09 
 The league format will change from three-round, 21-match system to a two-round, 14-match home and away system.
 The playoff system will be changed to home-and-away semifinals contested by the top four teams, followed by a one-match Grand Final. The Premier will no longer receive a bye to the final.
 Otago United will now play their home fixtures at Sunnyvale Park, moving from Carisbrook.
 YoungHeart Manawatu will now play their home fixtures at Memorial Park, moving from FMG Stadium
 Due to financial issues, Waikato FC will now play their home fixtures at Centennial Park in Ngaruawahia, moving from Waikato Stadium in Hamilton. It is expected the club will return to Hamilton the following season.
 Waitakere United will permanently return to Douglas Field, after spending the majority of the previous season at Fred Taylor Park.

Team locations

Participating clubs

League table

Competition Schedule

Round 1

Round 2

Round 3

Round 4

Round 5

Round 6

Round 7

Round 8

Round 9

Round 10

Round 11

Round 12

Round 13

Round 14

Finals

Bracket

Semi-final - 1st leg

Semi-final - 2nd leg

Grand final

External links 
 Official NZFC website
 NZ Soccer Scoreboard - NZFC 2008-09 page

New Zealand Football Championship seasons
1
New
New